Tariq Saeed Mufti, born on , is a surgeon and a medical educationist who resides in Peshawar, Pakistan.

Career
He had his initial schooling from a government high school in Peshawar and his premedical schooling from Edwards College, Peshawar. After qualifying his MBBS from Khyber Medical College in Peshawar, he proceeded to UK for training in general surgery and was awarded 'fellowship' from Royal College of Surgeons of Edinburgh in February 1979.

After returning to his native country, he continued his career at Ayub Medical College in Abbottabad, where he acceded to become a professor of surgery for seventeen years and held the chair of the department for eight years. During his service at this institution, he remained Chief Executive of the Ayub Teaching Institution for two tenures and held the position of Principal and Dean of Ayub Medical College until he retired from the institution. Then, he was assigned as the Principal of KUST Institute of Medical Sciences in Kohat. He successfully developed the institution to get its recognition by the Pakistan Medical and Dental Council (PMDC) and Ministry of Health in a short time. He then joined Rehman Medical Institute at Peshawar as the head of department of Surgery and Project Director for developing a new school of medicine by the name of Rehman Medical College. The institute has been approved by Ministry of Health, Government of Pakistan and is affiliated with Khyber Medical University. Prof. Tariq Mufti has been appointed as pioneer Principal of Rehman Medical College. Prof. Tariq Mufti also served as Dean for undergraduates at Khyber Medical University and for postgraduates at College of Physicians and Surgeons Pakistan (CPSP).

Prof. Tariq Mufti has also pioneered two research medical journals. He was a founding member of Journal of Ayub Medical College (JAMC) where he remained its chief editor for nearly ten years. The journal got its place on many of the world forums including getting indexed by Index Medicus and MEDLARS. It is one of the only four journals of the country to be accorded this status. He also founded KUST Medical Journal (KMJ) that got its place online as open access peer reviewed journal. The journal was awarded recognition by many of the relevant international forums right after its first issue publication.  He serves as member editorial board in a few of the research medical journals of Pakistan including Pakistan Journal of Surgery  and JSP.

References

Pakistani surgeons
1948 births
Living people